What We Must is the fourth studio album by the Norwegian band Jaga Jazzist. It was released 25 April 2005 by Ninja Tune.

Recording 
The album was produced by Kåre Christoffer Vestrheim and Marcus Schmickler. It was recorded by Mario Thaler in Uphon Studios, Germany July 2004, by Marcus Schmickler in Piethopraxis, Germany August 2004 and by Mike Hartung and Kåre Christoffer Vestrheim in Propeller Music Division, Norway October–December 2004. Mixed by Kåre Christoffer Vestrheim  and Mike Hartung in Propeller Music Division, December 2004. Mastered by Mike Hartung in Propeller Music Division.

Design of the album by Kim Hiorthøy and, to lesser extent, by Harald Frøland and Andreas Hessen Schei.

The title of the album was borrowed from a fanzine for Nieves Publishers.

Reception 
Sputnikmusic included the album in their list of top albums of 2005, at #52.

Track listing
All music arranged by Jaga Jazzist with Kåre Christoffer Vestrheim and Marcus Schmickler.

Personnel
Mathias Eick - trumpet, upright bass, vibraphone, keyboards, solina strings, vocals
Ketil Vestrum Einarsen - flute, alto flute, toy sax, wind controller
Harald Frøland - guitars and effects
Lars Horntveth - guitars, Bb clarinet, bass-clarinet, soprano sax, Mellotron, keyboards, lap steel, glockenspiel, tamboura, vocals
Line Horntveth - tuba, percussion, vocals
Martin Horntveth - drums, percussion, gong, vocals
Andreas Mjøs - guitars, vibraphone, Omnichords, marimba, percussion, glockenspiel
Even Ormestad - bass, SH-101, baritone guitar, piano, marimba
Andreas Hessen Schei - Synthesizers, Fender Rhodes, Wurlitzer, piano, Mellotron, vocals
Lars Wabø - trombone, euphonium

Additional sound
Kåre Christoffer Vestrheim - keyboards, Theremin, percussion

References 

2005 albums
Jaga Jazzist albums
Ninja Tune albums